The 2001–02 Ukrainian Hockey League season was the ninth season of the Ukrainian Hockey League, the top level of ice hockey in Ukraine. 13 teams participated in the league, and HC Berkut won the championship.

First round

Division A

Standings

Division B

Group A

Group B

Playoff-Qualification 

Semifinals
Barvinok Kharkiv 18 - HK Dnipro Kherson 0
Druzhba-78 Kharkiv 3 - Khimik Severdonetsk 1
Final
Barvinok Kharkiv 2 - Druzhba-78 Kharkiv 0
3rd place
Khimik Severdonetsk 9 - HK Dnipro Kherson 2

Playoffs

Pre-Playoffs 
 Politekhnik Kyiv - HK ATEK Kyiv 0:2
 HC Donbass - Barvinok Kharkiv 2:0

Semifinals
HC Berkut 2 - HK ATEK Kyiv 0
HC Sokil Kyiv 5 - HK Donbass Donetsk 0

Final
HC Berkut 2 - HC Sokil Kyiv 1

3rd place
HK Donbass Donetsk 2 - HK ATEK Kyiv 0

External links
Ukrainian Ice Hockey Federation 

UKHL
Ukrainian Hockey Championship seasons
Ukr